The 2003 WNBA All-Star Game was played on July 12, 2003 at Madison Square Garden in New York, New York, home of the New York Liberty. This is the second time New York hosted the contest after previously hosting the 1999 game. This is the 5th annual WNBA All-Star Game.

The All-Star Game

Rosters

1 Injured
2 Injury replacement
3 Starting in place of injured player

Coaches
The coach for the Western Conference was Los Angeles Sparks coach Michael Cooper. The coach for the Eastern Conference was New York Liberty coach Richie Adubato.

References

Wnba All-star Game, 2003
Women's National Basketball Association All-Star Game